Scott Statue may refer to:

 Equestrian statue of Winfield Scott, Washington, D.C.
 Statue of Harvey W. Scott, Portland, Oregon
 Statue of Robert Falcon Scott, Christchurch

See also
 Statue of Walter Scott (disambiguation)